Daniel Sheahan (1859 – May 3, 1897) was a Major League Baseball player. He played nine games for two different teams in the Union Association, mostly as an outfielder.

Sheahan is listed in some sources as Sheehan.  Sheahan appears to have played at least one game as "John M. Ryan", though not to be confused with another John Ryan who played professionally at the same time.

After departing his short baseball career, Sheahan spent time as a police officer in Washington, D.C., including a notable incident in which he shot and killed an intoxicated man named Addison Coleman. By 1888, Sheahan resigned from the police force due to being shot while on-duty and related stress, and by 1894 he was noted as in residence in an insane asylum in Limerick, Ireland, where he died in 1897.

References

Sources 

 Retrosheet

Major League Baseball outfielders
Washington Nationals (UA) players
Wilmington Quicksteps players
Baseball players from Washington, D.C.
1859 births
1897 deaths
19th-century baseball players